Pran Gopal Datta (born 1 October  1953) is a Bangladeshi physician, university administrator and politician. In September 2021, he won the candidacy of membership of Jatiya Sangsad representing the Comilla-7 constituency in a bi-election unopposed. The membership of the constituency became vacant after Ali Ashraf died in office in July 2021.

Datta was awarded the Independence Day Award, the highest civilian award in Bangladesh, for his contributions to the medical field in 2012. He is an ear, nose and throat specialist. He also served as the personal physician to Prime Minister Sheikh Hasina.

Background and education
Datta was born on 1 October 1953 in Mahichail village, Chandina, Comilla District, the second of seven brothers and sisters. He matriculated from Chandina Pilot High School in 1968 and attended Comilla Victoria College. He earned his MBBS degree at Chittagong Medical College in 1976, PhD degree from Odessa State Medical University in 1983, and an MSc in audiological medicine from University of Manchester in 1993.

Career
Datta regularly provides treatment to his patients at Green Life Hospital. In 2021, he was nominated by Awami League to contest by-elections for Jatiya Sangsad from Comilla-7 constituency after the death of Ali Ashraf.

References 

1953 births
Living people
People from Comilla District
Comilla Victoria Government College alumni
Odesa National Medical University alumni
Alumni of the University of Manchester
Bangladeshi surgeons
Otolaryngologists
Awami League politicians
Recipients of the Independence Day Award
11th Jatiya Sangsad members